Jack McMillan (born 18 December 1997) is a Scottish footballer who plays as a defender for Partick Thistle. He has previously played for Motherwell and Livingston, as well as a loan spell with Thistle.

Career

Motherwell
McMillan is a product of the Motherwell Academy. He made his debut for Motherwell on 15 October 2016, in a 2–0 defeat against Celtic.

On 2 December 2016, McMillan signed a new two-and-a-half-year deal with Motherwell.

On 31 August 2017, McMillan moved on loan to Livingston until January 2018.

Livingston
He then made the move permanent on 19 January 2018, signing until summer 2019. McMillan moved on loan to Partick Thistle in January 2019. He made 16 appearances for the Jags in all competitions in which he featured predominantly as part of a back three.

Partick Thistle return
Three years after his initial loan at the club, on 1 June 2022, McMillan signed a two-year deal with Partick Thistle.

Career statistics

References

External links
 Jack McMillan profile at Motherwell FC official website
 

1997 births
Living people
Scottish footballers
Sportspeople from Livingston, West Lothian
Association football defenders
Motherwell F.C. players
Livingston F.C. players
Scottish Professional Football League players
Partick Thistle F.C. players